"Glittering Prize" is a 1982 hit single by the Scottish rock group Simple Minds, and released on their fifth studio album New Gold Dream, released the same year.

The song reached number 16 in the United Kingdom, but was more successful in Australia, New Zealand and Norway, where it reached the top 10.

A compilation album, released by Simple Minds in 1992, is named after the song, and is entitled Glittering Prize 81/92.

Music video 
The video continuously alternates between two main stages. The first one is set in a golden room where the band members (Jim Kerr, Charlie Burchill, and Mick MacNeil only), all dressed in black, perform the song. The other stage is set in a dark, museum-like room, under the surveillance of a napping security guard, and featuring hanging portraits of the band members' faces made of gold. A story unfolds in this latter stage as a young woman in a bikini and whose body is all painted in gold, stealthily penetrating the room and reaching out to a sarcophagus within which lies a pharaoh version of  Kerr. After having touched his face and brought the other band members back to life she then drives away with them in a car. As the guard realises the burglary, the woman, now in the golden room, rests in a long chair and sips on a cocktail before the video ends.

Chart positions

References 

1982 singles
Simple Minds songs
Songs written by Derek Forbes
1982 songs
Virgin Records singles
Songs written by Jim Kerr
Songs written by Charlie Burchill
Songs written by Mick MacNeil